Brian Reid is a former motorcycle road racer and World Formula Two Champion from Northern Ireland.

Biography

Reid started racing in 1976 at St. Angelo airfield, Enniskillen, and had his first road race the same year at the Dundrod Circuit in Killinchy 150, riding a TD3 250 Yamaha. His first road race win came in 1979 at a wet Carrowdore meeting riding a 125cc Morbidelli.

He first tackled the Isle of Man course for the Manx Grand Prix in 1978, riding a Yamaha TZ250 which seized in the Newcomers race and threw him off at Cruickshanks corner in Ramsey. His best result at the Manx was a second place in the Senior race riding a Ray Cowles-sponsored RG500 Suzuki in 1980.

Reid's first TT race came in 1981, without much luck, but he won the first of his national championships the 350cc Ulster Grand Prix that same year.

In 1982 Reid created history by becoming the first rider to win 3 Irish road race championships in one year, taking the 250cc, 350cc and 500cc titles. In 1984 he made it a clean sweep winning 3 Ulster Championships and 3 Irish Championships the 250cc, 350cc and 500cc categories the first time that had been done. 1983 saw him crowned Irish Motorcyclist of the Year which he also won again in 1989.

In 1984 Reid turned his attention to the Formula TT world championship racing, sponsored by Mick Mooney of Irish Racing Motorcycles on a privately entered 350cc Yamaha. In that first year Reid collected a bronze medal and, but for a breakdown at the Ulster Grand Prix, could have been gold. Reid made amends in 1985 by taking gold with wins in Portugal, Spain and the Ulster, and repeated the feat in 1986 to be a double world champion; he also had the first of his 5 TT wins in this year.

1989 saw the launch of the Regal 600cc championship which Reid  dominating from the beginning, taking the title on the Budweiser Yamaha.  He retained his title in 1990 and won his second TT in the Supersport 600cc. Reid went on to take TT wins in 1992, with a double in the Supersport 400cc and Junior 250cc, and in 1993 with a Junior 250cc win.

In 1994 his career ended when he was involved in a serious accident at the Temple 100, which ultimately caused his retirement from racing.

Race statistics

International Isle of Man TT wins: 5
1986 Formula 2
1990 Junior Supersport 600
1992 Junior 250
1992 Supersport 400
1993 Junior 250
International Ulster GP wins: 9
1983 250cc
1983 350cc
1985 Formula 2
1987 250cc
1988 250cc
1989 600cc
1990 250cc
1992 250cc
1992 400cc
International North West 200 wins: 1
1989 600cc
Irish Short Circuit Championship wins: 9
250cc 2 Championships between 1982 – 1994
400cc 3 Championships 1991
600cc 4 Championships between 1989 – 1991
Regal 600 Championships: 2
1989 Supersport 600cc
1990 Supersport 600cc
Isle of Man National Road Race wins: 5
2nd 1980 Manx GP
5 Senior Southern 100 Race wins between 1982 – 1983

Race wins

North West 200
1989 Supersport 600 Yamaha 110.350 mph
Isle Of Man TT
1986 Formula 2 Yamaha 350 109.72 mph
1990 Supersport 600 Yamaha 111.98 mph
1992 Junior Yamaha 250 115.13 mph
1992 Supersport 400 Yamaha 110.50 mph
1993 Junior Yamaha 250 115.14 mph
Ulster Grand Prix
1983 250cc Yamaha 98.69 mph
1983 350cc Yamaha 97.76 mph
1985 Formula 2 Yamaha 350 111.19 mph
1987 250/350cc Yamaha 350 108.28 mph
1988 250/350cc EMC 250 109.09 mph
1989 Supersport 600 Yamaha 112.252 mph
1990 250/400cc Yamaha 250 116.033 mph
1992 250/400cc Yamaha 250 112.14 mph
1992 Supersport 400 Yamaha 107.31 mph
Killinchy 150
1984 350cc Yamaha 110.41 mph
1987 350cc Yamaha 112.06 mph
1988 250/350cc Yamaha 350 112.07 mph
1989 Supersport 600 Yamaha 110.85 mph
1990 250/350cc Race 1 Yamaha 250 113.65 mph
1990 250/350cc Race 2 Yamaha 250 114.27 mph
1990 Supersport 600 Yamaha 113.75 mph
Dundrod 150
1993 250cc Yamaha 101.11 mph

References

Motorcycle racers from Northern Ireland
Year of birth missing (living people)
Living people
Isle of Man TT riders